Alice Shaddle Baum (1928 – 2017) was an American sculptor, collage artist, and founding member of the Artemisia Gallery in Chicago.

Biography
Shaddle was born on December 21, 1928, in Hinsdale, Illinois. She attended Oberlin College, receiving her BFA in 1954 and the School of the Art Institute of Chicago receiving her MFA in 1972. 
She married Don Baum with whom she had two children.

Shaddle taught at the Hyde Park Art Center for over 50 years (from 1955 to 2006) and was an instructor in printmaking and drawing at Roosevelt University, Chicago, from 1965 to 1967. She was a founding member of the Artemisia Gallery in 1973.  Her image is included in the iconic 1972 poster Some Living American Women Artists by Mary Beth Edelson.

Her work is in the Smithsonian American Art Museum and the Museum of Contemporary Art, Chicago.

Shaddle died on November 27, 2017.

References

1928 births
2017 deaths
20th-century American women artists
American sculptors
Oberlin College alumni
School of the Art Institute of Chicago alumni